Turn Me Loose is the fourth studio album by American singer Ledisi. It was released by Verve Records on August 18, 2009 in the United States. It was recorded after Ledisi's experience with the writer's block, which she able to overcome it, after finding inspiration by listening on the Buddy Miles's album Them Changes (1970). In contrast to her previous work with jazz and soul influences, the album features a prominent funk sound.

The album debuted at number 14 on the US Billboard 200 chart, selling 27,000 copies in the first week. Upon its release, it received generally positive reviews from music critics, based on an aggregate score of 72/100 from Metacritic. Turn Me Loose received two nominations at the 52nd Grammy Awards including Best R&B Album.

Background 
Speaking in April 2010 to Blues & Soul, Ledisi explained how the title of the album reflected its musical diversity: "The title 'Turn Me Loose' is basically me saying 'I don't wanna be boxed in! Let me be myself as a performer and singer, because I do EVERYTHING! Not just one particular style!'." The singer was able to secure some of urban music's most respected producers, including Raphael Saadiq, Jimmy Jam & Terry Lewis and James "Big Jim" Wright. She also reunited with producer Rex Rideout, who contributed greatly to the sound of her previous album Lost & Found. With help from the four other producers, including Carvin & Ivan, Chief Xcel, Chucky Thompson, and Fyre Dept., the artist braided brilliant strains of rock, blues, classic soul, funk and hip-hop are all fused together throughout Turn Me Loose. The funky title track, for instance, updates the sassy grooves of vintage Stax. As a tribute to Buddy Miles, Ledisi does a cover of "Them Changes" as a bonus track.

Critical reception

At Metacritic, which assigns a normalized rating out of 100 to reviews from mainstream critics, Turn Me Loose has an average score of 72 based on 5 reviews, indicating "generally favorable reviews." Allmusic editor Andy Kellman found that Turn Me Loose "partially roots itself in the singer's past work and otherwise branches out from it [...] Most of the material that is in the vein of the subdued, sophisticated R&B showcased throughout much of Soulsinger and Lost & Found is fine, if sporadically tepid – something that really comes through when heard with the harder material."

Track listing

Notes
 denotes co-producer

Charts

Weekly charts

Year-end charts

References

External links 
 Press Release at EURweb

2009 albums
Ledisi albums
Albums produced by Jimmy Jam and Terry Lewis
Albums produced by Raphael Saadiq
Verve Forecast Records albums
Funk albums by American artists